Andreas Bausewein (born 5 May 1973) is a German politician of the Social Democratic Party (SPD) who serves as mayor of Erfurt.

Political career
In 1990 Bausewein joined the SPD. From 1995 to 2004 he was state chairman of the party's youth organization, the Young Socialists, in Thuringia. Since 1994 he was a member of the board of the Thuringian SPD. From 1998 to 2008 and again since 2010, he is Deputy Chairman of the State party. From 2004 until 2006 Bausewein was a member of the Landtag of Thuringia.

In May 2006, Bausewein won Erfurt’s mayoral election runoff against Dietrich Hagemann (CDU) with 60.2% of the vote (30.9% voter turnout).

During the vote for a new SPD State Executive Committee on 7 June  2008, Bausewein was not re-elected. The main reason for this was that he was involved in an internal party struggle between the current chairman Christoph Matschie and his predecessor Richard Dewes for the position of chairman. At the party convention on 6 March 2010, Bausewein was elected with 57 percent of votes in favour for the second time as one of the four vice-chairpersons of the state party. Bausewein scored the worst result of the candidates for the position of deputy national chairman.

Other activities

Corporate boards
 Helaba, Alternate Member of the Supervisory Board
 SWE Stadtwerke Erfurt, Ex-Officio Chairman of the Supervisory Board

Non-profit organizations
 Christivall22, Member of the Board of Trustees

Personal life
From 1995 until 2018, Bausewein was married to his wife Sysann. They have three children.

See also
List of Social Democratic Party of Germany politicians

References

1973 births
Living people
Social Democratic Party of Germany politicians
Politicians from Erfurt